Dorothy Ross (born 1936) is an American historian and Arthur O. Lovejoy Professor of History at Johns Hopkins University. She attended Smith College and Columbia University and taught at Hunter College and at the University of Virginia before Johns Hopkins. Her books include the G. Stanley Hall: The Psychologist as Prophet (1972) and The Origins of American Social Science (1991). The Society for U.S. Intellectual History named the Dorothy Ross Prize after Ross to honor her work in the history of psychology and modern social science.

She was married to Stanford G. Ross for sixty-two years before he died. She has two children and two grandchildren.

References 

1936 births
21st-century American women
American historians
American women historians
Columbia University alumni
Historians of science
Hunter College faculty
Johns Hopkins University faculty
Living people
Smith College alumni